Ryan Joseph Grant (born December 19, 1990) is an American football wide receiver who is a free agent. He played college football at Tulane and was drafted by the Washington Redskins in the fifth round of the 2014 NFL Draft.

Early life 
Grant was born in Beaumont, Texas and attended West Brook Senior High School, where he was a three-year letterman. He helped the Bruins win the District 21-5A title as a senior and advance to the state playoffs all three years. He was named first-team all-district as a senior after hauling in 42 receptions for 717 yards and seven touchdowns. As a junior, he caught 41 passes for 658 yards and four scores.

He was considered a two-star recruit by Rivals.com.

College career
Grant attended Tulane University from 2009 to 2013. During his career, he played in 47 games, catching 196 passes for 2,769 yards and 21 touchdowns. In the 2012 season, he led the Conference USA in receiving yards with 1,149. He was named a first-team All-C-USA selection twice, receiving the honor consecutively between his junior and senior seasons.

Professional career

Washington Redskins

Grant was drafted by the Washington Redskins in the fifth round (142nd overall) of the 2014 NFL Draft. On May 16, 2014, he signed a four-year, $2.36 million contract with the Redskins.

In 2015, Grant recorded his first career touchdown in the Week 7 win against the Tampa Bay Buccaneers which helped the Redskins comeback by its biggest deficit in Redskins franchise history. In the last game of the regular season against the Dallas Cowboys, Grant recorded his second career touchdown. In a Week 2 game against the Los Angeles Rams in September 2017, Grant caught a touchdown pass from quarterback Kirk Cousins late in the fourth quarter, helping the Redskins win by a score of 27–20.

Indianapolis Colts
On March 13, 2018, the Baltimore Ravens announced their intention to sign Grant to a four-year, $29 million contract with $14.5 million guaranteed. However, he failed his physical the next day, and the deal was voided making him a free agent. Grant ended up passing the Indianapolis Colts physical and signed a one-year, $5 million deal with them on March 20, 2018. In 2018, Grant appeared in 14 contests and made a career-high 10 starts for the Colts. In the regular season, he tallied 35 receptions for 334 yards, marks that each ranked fifth on the squad, while adding one receiving touchdown.

Oakland Raiders
On April 3, 2019, Grant signed with the Oakland Raiders.
Grant made his debut with the Raiders in week 1 against the Denver Broncos.  In the game, Grant made 3 catches for 16 yards in the 24–16 win. He was released on September 25, 2019.

Green Bay Packers
On October 16, 2019, Grant signed with the Green Bay Packers.

Calgary Stampeders 
On February 3, 2021, Grant signed with the Calgary Stampeders of the CFL. He was placed on the suspended list on July 10, 2021. He was released on August 2, 2021.

NFL career statistics

References

External links

Washington Redskins bio
Tulane Green Wave bio

1990 births
Living people
People from Beaumont, Texas
American football wide receivers
Tulane Green Wave football players
Washington Redskins players
Indianapolis Colts players
Oakland Raiders players
Green Bay Packers players
Calgary Stampeders players